The first USS Pompano was a United States Navy supply boat in commission from 1917 to 1919.

Pompano was built in 1906 as a civilian wooden motorboat of the same name at Pocomoke City, Maryland. In 1917, the U.S. Navy charter her from her owner, the Globe Fish Company in Elizabeth, North Carolina, for use in World War I. She was commissioned on 15 September 1917 as USS Pompano. Unlike most of the civilian motorboats the Navy acquired for use during the war, Pompano never received a section patrol (SP) number.

Assigned to the 5th Naval District, Pompano served as a supply boat for the rest of World War I. She was decommissioned on 31 January 1919 and was returned to the Globe Fish Company on 4 February 1919.

Notes

References
 
 Pompano at Department of the Navy Naval History and Heritage Command Online Library of Selected Images: U.S. Navy Ships -- Listed by Hull Number "SP" #s and "ID" #s -- World War I Era Vessels without Numbers (listed alphabetically by name)
http://www.navsource.org/archives/12/179936.htm NavSource Online: Section Patrol Craft Photo Archive Pompano]

Auxiliary ships of the United States Navy
World War I auxiliary ships of the United States
Ships built in Pocomoke City, Maryland
1906 ships